American actor and filmmaker Clint Eastwood, an audiophile, has had a strong passion for music all his life, particularly jazz and country and western music. He is a pianist and composer in addition to his main career as an actor, director, and film producer. He developed as a ragtime pianist early on, and in late 1959 he produced the album Cowboy Favorites, which was released on the Cameo label. Jazz has played an important role in Eastwood's life from a young age and although he was never successful as a musician, he passed on the influence to his son Kyle Eastwood, a successful jazz bassist and composer. Eastwood has his own Warner Bros. Records-distributed imprint, Malpaso Records, as part of his deal with Warner Brothers, which has released all of the scores of Eastwood's films from The Bridges of Madison County onward.  Eastwood co-wrote "Why Should I Care" with Linda Thompson-Jenner and Carole Bayer Sager, which was recorded by Diana Krall for the film True Crime (1999). "Why Should I Care" was also released on Krall's album When I Look in Your Eyes (also 1999). 

Eastwood composed the film scores of Mystic River, Million Dollar Baby, Flags of Our Fathers, Grace Is Gone, Changeling, Hereafter, J. Edgar, and the original piano compositions for In the Line of Fire. One of his songs can be heard over the credits of Gran Torino.

Albums

Singles

Guest singles

(*) "Smokin' the Hive" was the B-side of "A Few Ole Country Boys" (a duet with Travis and George Jones with no involvement from Eastwood), a record that hit number 8 on the U.S. country charts and number 4 on the Canadian charts.

Other songs

References

Bibliography

Discography
Eastwood, Clint
Eastwood, Clint